The American Academy of Appellate Lawyers is a non-profit organization consisting of the Fellows who have been elected to the Academy. It was founded in 1990 and incorporated as a 501(c)(3) in 1991. Its mission is to "advance the highest standards and practices of appellate advocacy and to recognize outstanding appellate lawyers."

Attorneys elected as Academy Fellows must have at least 15 years of practice experience in appellate law and a reputation for the “highest excellence in appellate work.” Membership is limited to only 500 members in the United States. The activities of the Academy are supported by the dues and initiation fees paid by the Fellows, and include biannual meetings. The organization's headquarters are in Rockville, Maryland.

Members 
 Robert D. Durham, Justice of the Oregon Supreme Court
 Timothy B. Dyk, U.S. Court of Appeals for the Federal Circuit
 Paul L. Friedman, U.S. District Court for the District of Columbia
 Tom Godwin, private practice
 Eric J. Magnuson, Chief Justice of the Minnesota Supreme Court
 Kevin Martin, private practice
 John G. Roberts, Jr., Chief Justice of the United States

See also  
 California Academy of Appellate Lawyers

References

External links 
 Official Website

Non-profit organizations based in Maryland
Organizations established in 1990
Rockville, Maryland